The Lachmund Family House, also known as the Halasz/Lachmund House, is a historic house located at 717 Water Street in Sauk City, Wisconsin. It is locally significant in the social history of Sauk City.  It was added to the National Register of Historic Places on March 29, 2000.

It is a two-story, cream brick house, surrounded by a reproduction wrought iron fence.  It has a wrap-around front porch.  It was built in c.1878 and c.1903.  The cream brick had to be brought by river from the railway at Portage;  the house seems to be the only residence in Sauk City built of that material in its era.

References

Houses in Sauk County, Wisconsin
Houses on the National Register of Historic Places in Wisconsin
Queen Anne architecture in Wisconsin
Gothic Revival architecture in Wisconsin
Houses completed in 1878
National Register of Historic Places in Sauk County, Wisconsin